The 2019–20 Czech Women's First League is the 27th season of the Czech Republic's top-tier football league for women. Sparta Prague were the defending champions.

On 7 April 2020, the Football Association of the Czech Republic's board of directors agreed to cancel the season early during the COVID-19 pandemic.

Format
The eight teams will play each other twice for a total of 14 matches per team. After that the top four teams will play a championship round for another six matches per team. The bottom placed four teams play the relegation round. The champion and runners-up qualify for the 2020–21 UEFA Women's Champions League.

Teams

Stadia and locations

Regular season

Standings
The regular season ended on 7 April 2020.

Results

Final stage
On 7 April 2020, the league announced that the play-offs would be cancelled due to the COVID-19 pandemic, with the regular season standings being used to determine the champions of the league.

Personnel and kits

Note: Flags indicate national team as has been defined under FIFA eligibility rules. Players may hold more than one non-FIFA nationality.

Top goalscorers
Updated to games played on 22 March 2020.

References

External links
Season at souteze.fotbal.cz

2019–20 domestic women's association football leagues
2019–20 in Czech football
Czech Women's First League seasons
Czech Republic